Samuel White (April 2, 1710 – March 20, 1769) was a prominent lawyer in the Province of Massachusetts Bay who served several terms as Speaker of the Massachusetts House of Representatives.

Biography
White was born in Weymouth, Massachusetts to Samuel and Ann (Bingley) White, .

Marriage
In November 1735 White married Prudence Williams daughter of Samuel Williams of Taunton, Massachusetts.

Notes

External links
 

Massachusetts lawyers
Members of the colonial Massachusetts House of Representatives
Members of the colonial Massachusetts Governor's Council
Politicians from Taunton, Massachusetts
Harvard University alumni
18th-century American lawyers
1710 births
1769 deaths
18th-century American politicians